Gordon was an electoral district of the Legislative Assembly in the Australian state of New South Wales. Originally created in 1904, replacing Willoughby. With the introduction of proportional representation, it was absorbed into the five-member electorate of Ryde, along with Burwood and Willoughby. It was recreated in 1927, but was abolished in 1999. It originally covered most of the suburbs of the Ku-ring-gai Council local government area (then known as Ku-ring-gai Municipality), including the suburbs of Lindfield and Gordon.

Recent Member of Parliament representing Gordon included:

 Harry Jago, who was NSW State Minister for Health in the Liberal party government of Robert Askin 1962–1973, and who famously failed to be re-elected at the 1973 election because he forgot to lodge the official nomination form by the required date.
 Kevin Harrold, MP from 1973 to 1976 representing the Democratic Labor Party, the only person ever elected to a single-member electorate in New South Wales representing that party. He was elected mainly as a consequence of the failure of Harry Jago to re-nominate.
 Tim Moore, MP from 1976 to 1992.

At the redistribution prior to the 1995 State election, the electorate of Gordon was abolished. The suburbs previously included in the Gordon electorate were mostly reassigned to Ku-ring-gai, with some other sections to Willoughby and some smaller ones to Davidson. Subsequent redistributions have resulted in most of the suburbs formerly in Gordon electorate now being within the Davidson electorate.

Members for Gordon

Election results

References

Former electoral districts of New South Wales
Constituencies established in 1904
1904 establishments in Australia
Constituencies disestablished in 1920
1920 disestablishments in Australia
Constituencies established in 1927
1927 establishments in Australia
Constituencies disestablished in 1999
1999 disestablishments in Australia